Indirect parliamentary elections were held in Cuba on 28 December 1981. 

On 11 and 18 October voters elected members of the 169 Municipal Assemblies. A total of 6,097,139 votes were cast in the first round (11 October) and in the second round (18 October), giving a turnout of 97% in the first round and 93.6% in the second. The elected members of the Municipal Assemblies then elected the 499 members of the National Assembly. Candidates were selected by a commission composed of the Communist Party, the Young Communist League or mass organisations.

References

Cuba
Parliamentary elections in Cuba
Local elections in Cuba
1981 in Cuba
One-party elections
December 1981 events in North America
Election and referendum articles with incomplete results